The Philippine Amateur Sepak Takraw Association is the national governing body for Sepak Takraw in the Philippines. It  is accredited by the International Sepaktakraw Federation which is the governing body for the sport of Sepak Takraw in the world.

External links
Philippine Amateur Sepak Takraw Association profile at the Philippine Olympic Committee website

Philippines
Sepak takraw